Jan Ely DuBois (born January 17, 1931) is a senior United States district judge of the United States District Court for the Eastern District of Pennsylvania.

Education and career

A native of Philadelphia, Pennsylvania, DuBois graduated from the University of Pennsylvania in 1952, with a Bachelor of Science degree. From 1952 to 1954 he served in the United States Army. He received his Bachelor of Laws from Yale Law School in 1957. While at law school, he served as a clerk in the Civil Division of the United States Department of Justice in 1956. After graduation, he was a law clerk to Judge Harry Ellis Kalodner of the United States Court of Appeals for the Third Circuit from 1957 to 1958. From 1958 to 1988 he worked in private practice in Philadelphia.

Federal judicial service

DuBois was nominated by President Ronald Reagan on May 10, 1988, to a seat on the United States District Court for the Eastern District of Pennsylvania vacated by Judge Clifford Scott Green. He was confirmed by the United States Senate on July 26, 1988, and received commission on July 27, 1988. He assumed senior status on April 15, 2002.

Notable case

He served as the judge in the case Robbins v. Lower Merion School District.

See also
 List of Jewish American jurists

References

Sources
 

1931 births
Living people
Judges of the United States District Court for the Eastern District of Pennsylvania
Lawyers from Philadelphia
United States Army officers
United States district court judges appointed by Ronald Reagan
20th-century American judges
University of Pennsylvania alumni
Yale Law School alumni
21st-century American judges